The 2010 Supercheap Auto Bathurst 1000 was a motor race for V8 Supercars. The race, which was held on Sunday, 10 October 2010 at the Mount Panorama Circuit just outside Bathurst, New South Wales, Australia was Race 18 of the 2010 V8 Supercar Championship Series. It was the fourteenth running of the Australian 1000 race, first held after the organisational split over the Bathurst 1000 that occurred in 1997. It was also the 53rd race for which the lineage can be traced back to the 1960 Armstrong 500 held at Phillip Island.

Entry list
31 cars were entered in the race – 20 Holden Commodores and 11 Ford Falcons. Along with the 29 regular season entries, there were two 'wildcards' from the Development Series that were contesting both endurance races – one from MW Motorsport and the other from Greg Murphy Racing. Three drivers made their 'Great Race' debuts – James Moffat, Ant Pedersen and Geoff Emery. Multiple drivers made their last Bathurst 1000 starts – Jason Richards, Glenn Seton, Tony Ricciardello, Damien Assaillit and Mark Noske.

*Entries with a grey background were wildcard entries which did not compete in the full championship season.

Driver changes
Several changes in driver pairings occurred between the 2010 L&H 500 (Race 17 of the Championship) and the Bathurst event. Fujitsu V8 Supercar Series racer Nick Percat stepped down from his drive with Andrew Thompson (Walkinshaw Racing) in favour of Team Penske Indycar driver Ryan Briscoe who had been unavailable for the L&H 500 due to his Indycar commitments. Similarly Tim Blanchard stepped aside from his Paul Morris Motorsport drive to allow Allan Simonsen to take up the seat alongside Greg Murphy.

Greg Murphy Racing was also forced into a driver change with the team unable to agree terms with its Phillip Island driver, Marcus Zukanovic. The team nominated Rod Salmon to take the position, his first Bathurst 1000 since 2001.

Practice
Honours was shared in Thursday practice between Triple Eight Race Engineering and Dick Johnson Racing. James Courtney topped the first session in the morning with Warren Luff fastest in the co-driver session held immediately afterwards. The final combined session saw Jamie Whincup record the fastest lap of the day with a 2:07.1309. Courtney was two tenths behind with Craig Lowndes a further two tenths away. Mark Winterbottom was fourth fastest with Jason Bright a surprise fifth fastest. 2009 Bathurst 1000 winner  Garth Tander was sixth fastest ahead of Paul Dumbrell, Will Davison, Russell Ingall and Jason Bargwanna.

Rod Salmon crashed in the morning session and was eleven seconds off the pace. Salmon stepped down from the drive of the #44 Greg Murphy Racing car and the originally nominated driver, Marcus Zukanovic, returned to the seat.

Steve Owen topped the co-driver session on Friday morning ahead of Luke Youlden, Warren Luff, Mark Skaife and Andrew Jones, the latter giving a preview of the pace of the #8 BJR Commodore. However, half an hour later the car was eliminated from qualifying after co-driver Jason Richards clipped the inside wall at Forrest's Elbow resulting in a heavy impact with the outside barrier. Jamie Whincup then hit the stationary car approximately a minute later, however the damage to Whincup's car was light and was repaired in time for qualifying. Richards’ car had bent chassis rails, and the Brad Jones Racing team would concentrate their efforts on Jason Bright for qualifying. Craig Lowndes offset Whincup's problems by recording the fastest ever lap around the circuit, a 2:06.8012, eclipsing Greg Murphy's 2003 pole position by five hundredths of a second.

Qualifying
Todd Kelly was an early victim of qualifying, the Kelly Racing Commodore brushing the wall at Griffin's Bend, damaging the rear suspension in such a manner that he would be unable to set a competitive qualifying lap. Craig Lowndes was fastest for much of qualifying, setting a time of 2:07.2184 early in the session. Whincup soon set second fastest time in his repaired Commodore and Mark Winterbottom was best of the rest for much of the session. With twelve minutes left in the session Jason Bright showed the pace Brad Jones Racing had by jumping past Winterbottom into third. Lee Holdsworth was next, followed by Greg Murphy with Steven Johnson moving into seventh as the final ten minutes began. Both Triple Eight drivers shaved tenths away as the session progressed but matching Lowndes’ time of 2:06.8 from the morning was looking less likely.

With five minutes to go Jason Bright set the time that earned Provisional Pole Position, a 2:07.0002. Seconds later James Courtney improved and Paul Dumbrell climbed into the top ten shortly afterwards. The final order saw Bright ahead of Lowndes, Whincup, Winterbottom, Holdsworth, Courtney, Will Davison and Garth Tander as the Holden Racing Team made up positions in the final minutes. Greg Murphy and Paul Dumbrell completed the shootout line-up with Steven Johnson missing out by nine hundredths of a second. Rick Kelly was best of the Kelly cars in twelfth just ahead of Shane van Gisbergen in the best of the Stone Brothers’ Fords and Steven Richards in the FPR Falcon.

At the back some drivers were struggling. Tony Ricciardello and Geoff Emery were respectively 1.3 and 2.4 seconds slower than the next best healthy car while Damian Assaillit would join the absent BJR Commodore of Jason Richards at the back when the MW Motorsport Falcon was disqualified from the session.

Shootout
Paul Dumbrell was first out, slightly untidy over the top of the Mountain to start the times with a lap just under 2:09. Greg Murphy was faster, then Garth Tander was faster again, the first driver to climb into the 2:07 bracket. Teammate Will Davison could not match Tander, and James Courtney was slower again.

Lee Holdsworth went fastest with a 2:07.7. Mark Winterbottom set the pole position time in the Ford with a 2:07.5377. Jamie Whincup was barely faster than Holdsworth. Craig Lowndes got the closest to Winterbottom, eight hundredths of a second shy. After being fastest on Friday, Jason Bright set a time which was only good enough for eighth grid position.

Despite practice pace which suggested a 2:06 was possible in the shootout, Winterbottom's pole lap was only the fifth fastest pole position in Bathurst history.

Race

Winterbottom lead the way at the start, pulling clear of Mark Skaife, Holdsworth, Davison, Whincup, Murphy, Courtney, Dean Canto and Steven Johnson.

Further back in the pack Cameron McConville and Michael Caruso both made very slow starts. Jason Bargwanna swerved to miss Caruso and was clipped by Fabian Coulthard on the left rear corner. Into The Chase on the same lap, Coulthard's left rear wheel failed, tipping the car into the sandtrap and rolling six times.

Holdsworth took the lead in the early laps while Whincup had moved up to third position by lap 12. Davison passed Winterbottom for second. Light rain began to fall on lap 19 and continued to fall intermittently for much of the morning. Dean Fiore went off the track at McPhillamy, causing a safety car after hitting the wall earlier in the lap on lap 58.

Lap 68 saw Jason Richards pit with a sticking throttle after being one of just two cars to record a 2:08 lap. Luke Youlden had a tyre deflate on the climb up to the Cutting and hit the wall on lap 71. Youlden limped back to the pits, the tyre was replaced and Mark Winterbottom was sent back out although times were immediately slower.

Jason Bargwanna stopped on Conrod Straight on lap 135, bringing out a safety car. On lap 154 Will Davison crashed out of third position at Sulman Park prompting the final safety car  of the race.

At the final restart Lowndes led Whincup, Tander, Courtney, Bright, Holdsworth, Murphy, Ingall, Winterbottom and Caruso. Holdsworth lost a place to Murphy, and a lap later Bright passed Courtney for fourth.

Lowndes led Whincup across the line for the first 1-2 team finish in the race since 1984 and the third in total. Garth Tander claimed third position for the Holden Racing Team and  Jason Bright finished fourth for Brad Jones Racing. James Courtney and Warren Luff were the best placed Ford in fifth. Greg Murphy finished sixth ahead of his teammate Russell Ingall in eighth. Between them was Lee Holdsworth, his seventh place a poor reward after leading the race for so long. Mark Winterbottom salvaged a ninth-place finish with Michael Caruso completing the top ten.

The total race elapsed time broke the long-standing 1991 record (6h 12m 51.4153s versus 6h 19m 14.80s). This was also the first time the race had been completed at an average speed above 160 km/h and 100 mph. The record stood for three years until beaten at the 2013 event.

Results

Qualifying

Top ten shootout

Starting grid
The following table represents the final starting grid for the race on Sunday:

Race results

Championship Standings
After Race 18 of 26 races.

Source

References

External links
Official race website
Official timing and results
Official series website

Supercheap Auto Bathurst 1000
Motorsport in Bathurst, New South Wales